Taylor Girlz are an American rap-dance-R&B musical trio consisting of sister rappers Daysha Taylor (born December 25, 1995) and Ti Taylor (born August 7, 1998 in Alabama), and dancer-choreographer Tiny. Raised in Atlanta, the Taylor sisters were inspired by their father's rapping to develop their own rhymes. They began working with Tiny in 2013. Now a full-fledged girl group, they first gained popularity in 2015 with their "Woozie" dance video.

In 2016 they released two singles produced by Bolo Da Producer (Silentó of "Watch Me (Whip/Nae Nae)" fame), "Steal Her Man" and "Wedgie," both featuring third Taylor sister Trinity. Both became hugely popular viral dance challenges, bringing the trio to prominence and a record deal with RCA Records.

The "Steal Her Man" challenge video received over 33 million YouTube views, the "Wedgie" video over 13 million. "Steal Her Man" hit No. 1 on Billboard'''s Bubbling Under R&B/Hip-Hop Chart, and the group appeared on Pandora Radio's Trendsetters Chart in November 2016. As of this writing the two dance singles have received a combined 40 million streams on Spotify, Apple Music and Vevo.

In February 2017 RCA released the group's EP Who Are Those Girlz!?''.

References

External links
 

American rhythm and blues musical groups
American girl groups